Denys Fisher (11 May 1918 – 17 September 2002) was an English engineer who invented the spirograph toy and created the company Denys Fisher Toys.

He left Leeds University to join the family firm, Kingfisher (Lubrication) Ltd. In 1960 he left the firm to set up his own company, Denys Fisher Engineering, in Leeds. In 1961 the company won a contract with NATO to supply springs and precision components for its 20 mm cannon. Between 1962 and 1964 he developed various drawing machines from Meccano pieces, eventually producing a prototype Spirograph. Patented in 16 countries, it went on sale in Schofields department store in Leeds in 1965. A year later, Fisher licensed Spirograph to Kenner Products in the United States. In 1967 Spirograph was chosen as the UK Toy of the Year.

Denys Fisher Toys, which also produced other toys and board games, was sold to Palitoy in 1970 and it was subsequently bought by Hasbro. Through the 1980s and 1990s Fisher continued to work with Hasbro in developing new toys and refining Spirograph.

Toys and games
Denys Fisher Toys produced the following toys and games:

Board Games
 Are You Being Served
 Dig (1971)
 Big Bully (1972)
 On the Buses (1973)
 The Fastest Gun
 Thomas Cook – Snap Happy
 Dad's Army (1974)
 Ghost Train (1974)
 Bounce Back (1974)
 It's a Knockout (1974)
 Generation Game (1975)
 Guinness Game of World Records (1975)
 The Magic Magic Magic Game (1975)
 Harvey Smith's Showjumping Game (1975)
 Haunted House
 Hotel
 Conquest (1975)
 Miss UK Game (1975)
 Miss World Game
 The Bionic Woman (1975)
 Jimmy Savile's Pop Twenty (1975)
 Up Periscope (1975)
 Doctor Who – with Tom Baker (1975)
 Six Million Dollar Man (1975)
 Six Million Dollar Man – Bionic Crisis (1976)
 James Hunt's Grand Prix Racing Game (1976)
 Perfection (1976)
 The New Avengers (1977)
 Trac 4 (1977)
 Rod Hull's Emu Game
 Scream Inn
 Morecambe & Wise
 War of the Daleks
 Multi-Coloured Swap Shop (1979)

Toys
 Cyborg, Muton and Android (reproductions of Takara's Shonen Cyborg toys)
 Incredible Stretch Hulk (1979, licensed from Mego Corporation)
 Sound A Round Talking Story Game (1969)
 Etch-a-Sketch
 Six Million Dollar Man
 Six Million Dollar Man – Bionic Bust-out Kit
 Six Million Dollar Man – Oscar Goldman
 Six Million Dollar Man – Maskatron
 Spirograph
 Super Spirograph (1971)
 Spiroscope (1972)
 Spirofoil
 Stickle bricks
 Doctor Who – Tom Baker Doll (1976)
 Doctor Who – Tardis (1976)
 Doctor Who – Leela (1976)
 Doctor Who – Giant Robot
 Roger De Courcey's Nookie Bear – Ventriloquist Bear (1976)
 Skull Machine
 Outrider
 Stretch Armstrong (licensed from Kenner)
 stretch octopus ( Ollie & Olivia )
 Star Wars – Large R2-D2 (1978)
 Star Wars – Darth Vader (1978)
 Star Wars – Stormtrooper (1978)

General Games
 Blockhead!
 George and Mildred
 Smash Up Derby : T-Bone Crash
 Chip Away (1972) a complete sculpting and painting set for Boys and Girls from 5-13(three sets:Tom and Jerry/The Flintstones/Animals)
 Screen-A-Show (1973)

References 

1918 births
2002 deaths
Board game designers
20th-century British inventors
20th-century British engineers
Businesspeople from Leeds
20th-century English businesspeople